Boys High School may refer to:

Australia 
Hamilton Boys' High School
Newcastle Boys' High School
Normanhurst Boys' High School
Otago Boys' High School
Sydney Boys High School
Westlake Boys High School

India
Boys' High School & College (Allahabad, Uttar Pradesh)

South Africa 
Jeppe High School for Boys
Kimberley Boys' High School
Paarl Boys' High School
Parktown Boys' High School
Pinetown Boys' High School
Potchefstroom High School for Boys
Pretoria Boys High School
Rondebosch Boys' High School
Wynberg Boys' High School

United States 
 Boys High School (Brooklyn), a former high school in Brooklyn, New York
 Boys and Girls High School, its successor school
 Midtown High School (Atlanta), in Atlanta, Georgia, known as Boys High School from 1924 to 1947
 Warren Easton High School, in New Orleans, Louisiana, known as Boys High School from 1843 to 1967